Ardeonaig (Gaelic: Aird Eòdhanaig) is a hamlet on the southern shore of Loch Tay in the Stirling Council area of Scotland. It is approximately 7 miles east of Killin and lies at the mouth of the Ardeonaig Burn where it enters Loch Tay.

When boats ran on the loch they stopped at Ardeonaig, where coal was delivered and passengers could disembark. Now, fishing trips on Loch Tay stop at the Ardeonaig Hotel jetty to disembark for lunch before continuing down the Loch. There must have been a ferry service because the minister came by boat to conduct church services. At Ardeonaig there is an outdoor centre, run by the Abernethy Trust.

References

External links

Vision of Britain - Ardeonaig
Canmore - Ardeonaig, Old Manse site record
Canmore - Mains Castle site record

Hamlets in Stirling (council area)